Heterocycles is a scientific journal on the topic of heterocyclic compounds. In 2006 it was awarded the "In Memory of Professor A.N. Kost" medal by Lomonosov Moscow State University and Mendeleev Russian Chemical Society.

The impact factor of this journal is 1.079 (2014).

References 

Chemistry journals
English-language journals
Publications established in 1973